The Bornean white-bearded gibbon (Hylobates albibarbis), also known as the Bornean agile gibbon or southern gibbon, is a species of gibbon endemic to southern Borneo. It is an endangered species, due to the undergoing logging of the tropical forests, between the Kapuas and Barito rivers. Additional issues are of concern to the endangerment of white-bearded gibbons and threatening to other arboreal primates.

The white-bearded gibbon is very similar to other gibbons in their behaviour and their frugivorous diet. The Bornean white-bearded gibbon was formerly considered a subspecies of the agile gibbon but based on recent DNA research, some now classify it as a separate species.

About 

The Bornean white-bearded gibbon is commonly seen with grey or dark brown fur, a black face, and white beard. Similar to other gibbons, these gibbons are a smaller ape that is tailless. They tend to live in small family groups consisting of a male, female, and their offspring. They express pair-bonding relationships and they do not make nests. Their mode of transportation is called brachiation, where they swing from branches to get around. They have been documented to swing up to 15 meters (49.2 feet) in a single leap and as fast as 55 kilometers (34 miles) per hour. Apart from other primates, all gibbons walk bipedally; holding their long arms over their heads.

The average life span for a white-bearded gibbon is 25 years and grow anywhere from 17 to 25 inches. Male white-bearded gibbons weigh about 6.1 to 6.9 kg (13.5 to 15.2 pounds), and females weigh 5.5 to 6.4 kg (12 to 14 pounds). Female white-bearded gibbons tend to reach sexual maturity in about 48 months.

Diet 
The Bornean white-bearded gibbons diet in the tropical forest tends to be frugivorous, where they depend on the abundant of fruit trees and figs; respectively, making  their diet 65% fruit and 23% figs. They will occasionally supplement their diet with leaves and insects.

Threats 
Logging and mining have created a threatening environment in Borneo for gibbons and all arboreal creatures. Since gibbons rely on dense and tall forest areas for safety and for travelling, this is a leading problem for the survival of white-bearded gibbons. Additional threats for the white-bearded gibbon are forest fires due to global warming and climate change.

References

Bornean white-bearded gibbon
Endemic fauna of Borneo
Primates of Indonesia
Mammals of Borneo
Endangered fauna of Asia
Species endangered by deliberate fires
Species endangered by human consumption
Species endangered by logging
Species endangered by the pet trade
Species endangered by wetland drainage
Bornean white-bearded gibbon
Taxa named by Marcus Ward Lyon Jr.